Alessandro Piacenti (born 24 August 1992) is an Italian footballer who plays a goalkeeper.

Biography
Born in Terni, Umbria, Piacenti started his senior career at non-professional club Todi. In 2012, he was signed by Serie C2 club Foligno (in co-ownership deal with Ternana), where he was the first choice keeper. On 21 June 2013 Foligno acquired him outright. He was immediately sold to Parma.

Parma
In summer 2013 he was signed by Serie A club Parma, but immediately left for Ascoli in temporary deal. However, since the arrival of Stefano Russo also from Parma, Piacenti became an understudy. On 9 January 2014 Piacenti was signed by Vigor Lamezia, with Antonio Torcasio moved to Parma, but remains at Lamezia on loan.

On 8 July 2014 Piacenti's loan was renewed. Lamezia also signed Spirito, Maglia, Puccio and Rossini from Parma on the same day.

References

External links
 AIC profile (data by football.it) 
 Alessandro Piacenti at Soccerway

1992 births
Living people
Italian footballers
Ternana Calcio players
A.S.D. Città di Foligno 1928 players
Ascoli Calcio 1898 F.C. players
Vigor Lamezia players
A.C. Perugia Calcio players
Serie C players
Association football goalkeepers
People from Terni
Footballers from Umbria
Sportspeople from the Province of Terni